Gustav von Hayek (21 March 1836 in Brno – 11 January 1911 in Vienna) was an Austrian naturalist. He was the father of botanist August von Hayek (1871–1928) and the grandfather of economist Friedrich von Hayek (1899–1992).

He studied natural sciences at the University of Vienna, and served as an assistant to naturalist Andreas Kornhuber (1824–1905). Following graduation in 1869, he worked as a Gymnasialprofessor of natural sciences and chemistry in Vienna (1869 to 1901). He was secretary of the Comité international permanent ornithologique. 

He was the author of a popular textbook for secondary school students, titled "Illustrierter Leitfaden der Naturgeschichte des Thierreiches" (Illustrated guide to the natural history of the animal kingdom, 1876). He was also author of the four volume "Handbuch der Zoologie", published from 1877 to 1893:
 Volume I: Protozoa, Coelenterata, Echinodermata und Vermes, 1877
 Volume II: Arthropoda, 1881
 Volume III: Mollusca, Vertebrata Anallantoidica, 1885
 Volume IV: Vertebrata Allantoidica: Reptilia, Aves, Mammalia, 1893.

References 

1911 deaths
1836 births
Scientists from Brno
People from the Margraviate of Moravia
Austrian naturalists
University of Vienna alumni
Austrian people of Moravian-German descent